Portuguese abortion referendum may refer to:

 Portuguese abortion referendum, 1998
 Portuguese abortion referendum, 2007